Rosario Mendes (born 25 October 1989) is an Indian professional footballer who plays as a midfielder for Salgaocar in the I-League.

Career

Salgaocar

Born in Cortalim, Goa, Mendes made his debut for Salgaocar F.C. in the I-League on 13 April 2013 against United Sikkim in which he came on in the 70th minute for Nicolau Colaco as Salgaocar won the match 9–0.

Career statistics

References

External links 
 

1989 births
Living people
Footballers from Goa
I-League players
Association football midfielders
Salgaocar FC players
People from South Goa district
Indian footballers